Qujiang District, formerly Qu County, is a district of Quzhou City, Zhejiang, China.

Administrative divisions
Subdistricts:
Zhangzhang Subdistrict (樟潭街道), Fushi Subdistrict (浮石街道)

Towns:
Shangfang (上方镇), Duze (杜泽镇), Nianli (廿里镇), Houxi (后溪镇), Dazhou (大洲镇), Hunan (湖南镇), Xiachuan (峡川镇), Lianhua (莲花镇), Quanwang (全旺镇), Gaojia (高家镇)

Townships:
Taizhen Township (太真乡), Yunxi Township (云溪乡), Henglu Township (横路乡), Huiping Township (灰坪乡), Jucun Township (举村乡), Zhoujia Township (周家乡), Shuangqiao Township (双桥乡), Lingyang Township (岭洋乡), Huangtankou Township (黄坛口乡)

References

Districts of Zhejiang
Quzhou